"Villanova" (or "How I Became a Former Professional Literary Agent") is a short story by American humorist John Hodgman. It was first published in the first issue of One Story on April 1, 2002.

Premise 
While attending a 1998 romance and western fiction writers' conference in an Oklahoma City Embassy Suites, an unnamed literary agent stumbles across an elusive science fiction writer who has largely disappeared since the 1970s after publishing an incomplete trilogy.

The story is interspersed with excerpts from a fictional June 1979 Playboy magazine article called "Where Is Darling Egan?"

Publication 
The original publication of Villanova was limited to a print run of 600 with an overall cost of $1,000.

Villanova was republished as "How I Became a Former Professional Literary Agent" in the final chapter "The Beginning" for Hodgman's 2011 satirical almanac That Is All.

Reception 
New York Journal of Bookss Vinton Rafe McCabe reviewed the story (along with the penultimate That Is All chapter "The End") as "honestly, in and of themselves, worth the cost of all three books."

References 

2002 short stories
Short stories by John Hodgman
Short stories set in Oklahoma